Ralph Kurek (born 1943) was a player in the National Football League for the Chicago Bears from 1965 to 1970 as a running back. He played at the collegiate level at the University of Wisconsin–Madison.

Biography
Kurek was born Ralph Elmer Kurek on February 23, 1943 in Milwaukee, Wisconsin. His family later moved to Watertown, Wisconsin, and he played high school football for Watertown High School.

See also
List of Chicago Bears players

References

Chicago Bears players
Living people
1943 births
University of Wisconsin–Madison alumni
Players of American football from Milwaukee
Wisconsin Badgers football players
American football running backs